Vallachira Madhavan (17 May 1934 – 20 October 2013) was a Malayalam novelist and short story writer from Vallachira in Thrissur District of Kerala state of  India.

References

1934 births
2013 deaths
Indian male novelists
Malayalam novelists
People from Thrissur district
Novelists from Kerala
Malayalam-language writers
Indian male short story writers